Brian Tochi (born Brian Keith Tochihara; May 2, 1959) is an American actor. During the late 1960s through much of the 1970s, he was one of the most widely seen East Asian child actors working in U.S. television, appearing in various TV series and nearly a hundred advertisements. He is best known for his characters Toshiro Takashi from the Revenge of the Nerds film franchise, Cadet (later Lieutenant) Tomoko Nogata from the third and fourth films in the Police Academy film series, and as the voice of Leonardo in the first three live-action Teenage Mutant Ninja Turtles films. He is also known as Brian Keith Tochi.

Career

As a child actor
A beginning role for Tochi was a guest-starring appearance in the short-lived television series He & She (1967–68, with Richard Benjamin and Paula Prentiss) as their newly adopted son. Produced by Leonard Stern and cowritten by Chris Hayward and Allan Burns, it also starred Jack Cassidy as an egomaniacal actor, Kenneth Mars, and Hamilton Camp. That same year saw Tochi appearing in "And the Children Shall Lead", a third-season episode of Star Trek. Other roles followed, including guest appearances on such popular shows as The Brady Bunch, The Partridge Family and Adam-12.

Tochi's debut as a series regular was as Yul Brynner's oldest son and heir Crown Prince Chulalongkorn in Anna and the King on CBS. It was based on the film version of Rodgers and Hammerstein's The King and I and also starred Samantha Eggar and Keye Luke. Although the series was short-lived, Tochi and Brynner remained friends until Brynner's death in 1985. Concurrent with the series, Tochi was cast with fellow actor Luke in his first animated television series The Amazing Chan and the Chan Clan; also in the series was a young Jodie Foster, who voiced one of the Chan sisters.

After both series ended, guest-starring roles followed, including The Streets of San Francisco with Karl Malden and Michael Douglas; and Kung Fu, with David Carradine, who made his directing debut on the episode, "The Demon God" (which was Tochi's largest guest role of three Kung Fu episodes he appeared in). Tochi also played an undercover informant who was beaten and killed in a gritty two-part episode of Police Story on NBC. He played another character that nearly died on the Robert Young medical drama Marcus Welby, M.D..

Young adulthood in theater
During the mid-1970s, Tochi spent time in the theatre, this time reprising his role as Crown Prince Chulalongkorn in the Los Angeles Civic Light Opera's revival of the musical The King and I at the Dorothy Chandler Pavilion. There he co-starred with actor Ricardo Montalbán, as the King of Siam, to which they would later accompany the show as it went on tour.

Return to television
Tochi returned to star in another TV series Space Academy (1977–1979) with veteran actor Jonathan Harris (best remembered as Dr. Smith from Lost in Space). Up until that time, Space Academy was the most expensive Saturday morning television series in broadcast history. His character, Tee Gar Soom, had super-strength and continued the martial arts traditions of his Asian ancestors. During hiatus of the show, Tochi was asked to shoot a 20-minute promotional "behind-the-scenes" visit to the Space Academy for a popular daytime series, Razzmatazz, on CBS. Razzmatazz was a highly regarded news magazine show created by 60 Minutes wizard Don Hewitt and produced by Joel Heller with the same production team as CBS's In The News the long-running Saturday morning news programs for children. Razzmatazz originally starred Barry Bostwick, who opted to leave the show for a career in features, to capitalize on his recently released cult classic The Rocky Horror Picture Show. Searching for a new host, the television network persuaded Tochi to accept their offer of his own daytime show, which aired on the network for 4 more years into the early 1980s.

Other appearances include a guest stint on Wonder Woman, a recurring character in the tropically set Hawaii Five-O, starring actor Jack Lord, a two-hour television film We're Fighting Back (with Ellen Barkin and Stephen Lang), and regular television roles in the TV dramas St. Elsewhere and Santa Barbara. He later played a featured character in the Star Trek: The Next Generation episode "Night Terrors" (making him one of only a handful of living actors to have appeared on the original Star Trek series and a subsequent spin-off). Tochi also appeared as the titular character in "Wong's Lost and Found Emporium," the ninth episode from the first season of the television series The Twilight Zone. The episode is based on the short story "Wong's Lost and Found Emporium" by William F. Wu, first published in Amazing Stories in 1983. This episode was stretched into a half-hour run time for syndication, as recently shown on the Chiller TV network.

In the short lived ABC TV series The Renegades, he starred with his friend, Patrick Swayze, as the martial arts expert and former gang leader known as Dragon. Then, exercising his journalistic prowess, Tochi later became part of the core team that created and developed the cutting edge educational news program Channel One News. During his two-and-a-half-year association, his responsibilities grew to include Hosting and Narrating duties, utilizing his talents as a writer, producer and segment director. He was later named Chief Foreign correspondent for the show.

Other work
In 2004, Tochi co-wrote, produced and directed Tales of a Fly on the Wall, a scripted, live-action comedy, casting several of his friends in lead roles; it included fellow actors Roscoe Lee Browne, his Revenge of the Nerds co-star Curtis Armstrong and his Police Academy 3: Back in Training co-star Leslie Easterbrook. In 2005, he was one of the winners of the Hollywood Film Festival's Hollywood Screenplay Awards, taking home top honors for co-writing the screenplay "In the Heat of the Light". He continues with his directing, producing, and screenwriting careers.

Tochi has also provided voices for numerous animated films, computer games and animated cartoon series, including the Bionic Six (all 65 episodes), Challenge of the GoBots, Scooby-Doo and Scrappy-Doo, What's New, Scooby-Doo?, The Real Adventures of Jonny Quest, and Mortal Kombat: Defenders of the Realm (as its main star Liu Kang). He performed the voice of Leonardo in the first three Teenage Mutant Ninja Turtles films in the early 1990s. He also is the voice of the Chinese soldier who runs the Great Wall in Disney's Mulan, and had recurring roles in Batman Beyond, As Told by Ginger, Kim Possible, Johnny Bravo, Static Shock, Family Guy and Avatar: The Last Airbender.

Filmography

Film

Television

Video games

References

External links

 

1959 births
Living people
American male child actors
American male film actors
Film producers from California
American male screenwriters
American male television actors
American television journalists
American male voice actors
Male actors from Los Angeles
American male actors of Japanese descent
American film actors of Asian descent
American male journalists
American journalists of Asian descent
American writers of Japanese descent
American film directors of Japanese descent
Film directors from California
Screenwriters from California